Lactate dehydrogenase A (LDHA) is an enzyme which in humans is encoded by the LDHA  gene. It is a monomer of Lactate dehydrogenase, which exists as a tetramer. The other main subunit is lactate dehydrogenase B (LDHB).

Function 
Lactate dehydrogenase A catalyzes the inter-conversion of pyruvate and L-lactate with concomitant inter-conversion of NADH and NAD+. LDHA is found in most somatic tissues, though predominantly in muscle tissue and tumors, and belongs to the lactate dehydrogenase family. It has long been known that many human cancers have higher LDHA levels compared to normal tissues. It has also been shown that LDHA plays an important role in the development, invasion and metastasis of malignancies. Mutations in LDHA have been linked to exertional myoglobinuria.

Interactive pathway map

Model organisms 

				
Model organisms have been used in the study of LDHA function. A conditional knockout mouse line, called Ldhatm1a(EUCOMM)Wtsi was generated as part of the International Knockout Mouse Consortium program — a high-throughput mutagenesis project to generate and distribute animal models of disease to interested scientists.

Male and female animals underwent a standardized phenotypic screen to determine the effects of deletion. Twenty seven tests were carried out on mutant mice and five significant abnormalities were observed. Few homozygous mutant embryos were identified during gestation, and none survived until weaning. The remaining tests were carried out on heterozygous mutant adult mice. Animals of both sex had  abnormal plasma chemistry, males also had improved glucose tolerance and increased red blood cell distribution width.

LDHA Inhibitors
The following compounds have been demonstrated to inhibit the LDHA enzyme:
 Oxamate
 Epigallocatechin gallate
 Quinoline 3-sulfonamide

References

Further reading

External links 
 

Genes mutated in mice